

Dinosaurs

Newly named dinosaurs

References 

1820s in paleontology
Paleontology